Joséphine Drabo Kanyoulou is a Burkinabé politician. She has served as a member of the Pan-African Parliament representing Burkina Faso, vice president of the Alliance for Democracy and Federation – African Democratic Rally, a women’s leadership program member for the Africa Liberal Network, a collaborator with Women Political Leaders and the National Democratic Institute, and as the second-vice president of the parliament of the Economic Community of West African States.

She was one of a delegation of women MPs who attended COP21 representing the Women in Parliaments Global Forum and National Democratic Institute.

References

Burkinabé politicians
Year of birth missing (living people)
Living people
Members of the Pan-African Parliament from Burkina Faso